Diane Tuckman is an American artist. She is known for her silk painting work, and as an author of several books on the subject with Jan Janas. She resides and works in Lanham, Maryland in the Greater Washington, D.C. area.

Tuckman was born in Egypt.

Early life and work 
In an interview with The Washington Free Beacon, Tuckman recalled that while living in Egypt as a child during WWII, "they were shooting Jewish girls in the street…My family and I escaped in 1948 and went to France." Though less harrowing, even in France "it was a very difficult time after the war, with ration tickets and very little housing." Tuckman moved to the United States in 1958 soon after marriage. Tuckman is credited as one of the seminal artists who helped to popularize silk painting in the United States through her books, and when her company (Ivy Imports) was the first US-based company to "import the French dyes needed to paint on silk."

Tuckman is also the co-founder of the nonprofit organization Silk Painters International (SPIN), which in 2000 helped to organize the Second International Silk Painting Congress at George Mason University. SPIN now routinely organizes a silk painting biennial; the most recent one was held in 2018 in Gatlinburg, TN. The organization now has over 500 members.

Books co-authored with Jan Janas
The Complete Book of Silk Painting. Cincinnati, OH: North Light. .
Creative Silk Painting. Cincinnati, OH: North Light. .
The Best of Silk Painting. Cincinnati, OH: North Light. .
The Fine Art of Painting on Silk. Atglen, PA: Schiffer, 2018 .

Exhibitions 
Tuckman has exhibited and curated silk art exhibitions around the Greater Washington, DC region. She has been referred to as "a silk painting pioneer in America, she teaches, paints, and exhibits her own silk paintings, as well as promotes the art form through her educational programs."

References

External links 
Artomatic 2017 Interview Video
Silk Painters International (SPIN)

Living people
20th-century Egyptian artists
20th-century American women artists
American contemporary painters
Painters from Washington, D.C.
Painters from Maryland
Jewish American artists
Year of birth missing (living people)
People from Maryland
21st-century American Jews
21st-century American women